Rina Marie Padilla Raymundo (born December 9, 1975), known professionally as Ina Raymundo, is a Filipino actress, commercial model, and singer. She is best known for her appearance on the 1995 San Miguel Beer's television advertisement "Sabado Nights" (English: Saturday Nights), and its 2017 remake. Raymundo was nominated for the Gawad Urian Award for Best Actress for the film Tuhog (2001) where she portrayed a victim of incestuous rape. She has also released an album and performed on stage plays.

In 1994, Raymundo appeared in her first magazine cover at 18 years old. She then appeared nude on the cover of the March 2000 issue of People Asia. She also appeared on the cover of the November 2015 issue of FHM Philippines at age 39. She appeared again on the cover of FHM Philippines for the March 2017 issue, at age 41.

In 2003, Raymundo married Ukrainian-Canadian businessman Brian Poturnak. The couple have five children together named Erika Rae, Jakob, Mikaela Jade, Anika Sage and Minka Eve.

Filmography

Film

Television

Discography

Studio albums

Recognitions

References

External links

1975 births
Living people
Filipino film actresses
Filipina gravure idols
Filipino television actresses
21st-century Filipino women singers
GMA Network personalities
ABS-CBN personalities